The Czech State Award for Literature is an award given by the Ministry of Culture of the Czech Republic. The Czech State Award for Literature is awarded for an original literary work in Czech published during the preceding year or in recognition of a lifetime’s work of excellence. The prize consists of a certificate and  300,000 CZK Czech koruna. It is awarded each year on October 28 along with the Czech State Award for Translation.

Laureates 
Czech State Award for Literature

See also
List of Czech literary awards

References 

Czech literary awards